Marte Alexander Martinelli (born March 1, 1976) is an American born Italian basketball player.

Life 

Born in Inglewood, she studied at University of Arizona and played with the Wildcats team. In 1998 she joined the Italian team Bees Pavia in the Italian league, from 1999 to 2001 he played for Bees Treviglio team. From 2002 to 2004 Alexander played for Germano Zara team, then she played for 1 year in Reggio Emilia. After one year in the Spanish league with Gran Canaria she returned to Germano Zara Faenza, her current team.
In 2006, she acquired the Italian citizenship and played for the Italy women's national basketball team in the EuroBasket Women 2009.
In June 2012 Alexander retired.

References

1976 births
Living people
American women's basketball players
Arizona Wildcats women's basketball players
Italian people of American descent
Italian women's basketball players
Los Angeles Sparks draft picks
Naturalised citizens of Italy
Basketball players from Inglewood, California